Worth County Courthouse may refer to:

Worth County Courthouse (Georgia), Sylvester, Georgia
Old Worth County Courthouse (Iowa), Northwood, Iowa
Worth County Courthouse (Iowa), Northwood, Iowa
Worth County Courthouse (Missouri), Grant City, Missouri